Edward Everett Robbins (September 27, 1860 – January 25, 1919) was a Republican member of the U.S. House of Representatives from Pennsylvania.

Edward E. Robbins was born at Robbins Station, Westmoreland County, Pennsylvania, son of Joseph Robbins, a coal mine operator. He attended the Elder's Ridge Academy and the Indiana Normal School. He graduated from Washington and Jefferson College in Washington, Pennsylvania, in 1881 and from the law department of Columbia College in New York City, in 1884. He was admitted to the bar in 1884 and commenced practice in Greensburg, Pennsylvania. He was also engaged in banking and coal-mining enterprises. He was a member of the Pennsylvania State Senate from 1888 to 1892. He served as chairman of the Republican county committee in 1885. He was a member of the Pennsylvania National Guard, and served as major of Volunteers in the Spanish–American War in 1898.

Robbins was elected as a Republican to the Fifty-fifth Congress. He was not a candidate for renomination in 1898. He resumed the practice of his profession in Greensburg. He was elected to the Sixty-fifth Congress and served until his death. He had been reelected to the Sixty-sixth Congress, but died in Somerset, Pennsylvania, before taking his seat. Interment in Saint Clair Cemetery in Greensburg.

See also
 List of United States Congress members who died in office (1900–49)

References
 
 Westmoreland County Pennsylvania Genealogy Project

External links
 
 Edward E. Robbins, late a representative from Pennsylvania, Memorial addresses delivered in the House of Representatives and Senate frontispiece 1920

1860 births
1919 deaths
Republican Party Pennsylvania state senators
Washington & Jefferson College alumni
Columbia College (New York) alumni
American military personnel of the Spanish–American War
Republican Party members of the United States House of Representatives from Pennsylvania
19th-century American politicians